Neoxabea bipunctata, the two-spotted tree cricket, is a species of tree cricket in the family Gryllidae. It is found in North America.

References

External links

 

Tree crickets
Articles created by Qbugbot
Insects described in 1773
Taxa named by Charles De Geer